Marek Skrobecki (born September 18, 1951 in Kalisz) is a Polish director of animated films, mainly using classical puppetry techniques. He works with the film studio Se-ma-for in Łódź.

Biography 
He graduated from the Academy of Fine Arts In Łódź. In 1990 he finished at the Faculty of Film Animation at National Film School in Łódź.

He received grants from the British Council and worked at Jim Henson's Creature Shop and Aardman Animation in 1992. In 1988 he made his first film Episode. Then he tried to draw cartoons for children's films. However, in 1992 with Se-ma-for cooperation he produced the film D.I.M having created human-size puppets for it. His technique was very innovative in the animation world and was successfully used in the future production, for example in Ichthys.

In 2006 he produced with Suzie Templeton a Polish-British co-production of Peter and the Wolf, which was awarded the 2007 Oscar for Best Animated Short Film.

He worked with famous Polish music group Agressiva 69 and directed two of their videos: "Situations" and "Devil Man".

Filmography 
 1988 – Episode – director, writer, visual art
 1989 – Birthday Cake – director, writer, visual art
 1991 – Last sandwich – director, writer, visual art
 1992 – DIM – director, writer, visual art
 1993 – What We Dream Of episode: “Head in the clouds – director
 1995 – OM – director, writer, visual art
 1998 – Marchenbilder (Fable Photos) – director, visual art (visual art concept Ryszard Kaja)
 2005 – Ichthys – director, scenography
 2010 – Danny Boy – director, writer
 and production/opening logos, TV interludes and animation advertising (YES YES, Ery GSM, "Saga", "E", "LOT")

Cooperation 
 1993 – Dreams Republic – special effects
 1993 – Schindler's List (directed by Steven Spielberg) – special effects and scenography elements
 1994 – Dogs 2 – The Last Blood (directed by Wladyslaw Pasikowski) – graphic design
 2000 – Bajland (directed by Henry Dederko) – scenography, interior design
 2000–2001 – Paradise (directed by Andrew Burl) – co director
 2006 – Peter and the Wolf (directed by Suzie Templeton) – scenography

Awards 
 1988 – Film Episode – Grand Prize "Jantar" in the short film category for his directorial debut at the Youth Film Meetings ( Młodzieżowe Spotkania Filmowe) "The Young and Film"Koszalin
 1994 – Film D.I.M – jury special award at the International Film Festival of Fantasy, Thriller & Science Fiction in Brussels
 1994 – Film D.I.M – Award at the International Short Film Festival, Cracow Krakow
 1994 –  Film D.I.M – Special Jury Award at the World Festival of Animated Films in Zagreb
 1994 – Film D.I.M – Award at the International Animated Film Festival in Espinho
 1999 – Film Fable Photos – Award: Golden Line at the Festival of Animation Films "OFAFA" in Cracow
 2005 – Film Ichthys – Honorary Diploma at 45 Crakow Film Festival
 2005 – Film Ichthys – Award for best short documentary film at the Ottawa Animation Film Festival.
 2005 – Film Ichthys – Brown Jabberwocky Award – Etude-Anima Festival in Crakow
 2005 -Film Ichthys – Silver Line Award at the Festival of Animation Films "OFAFA" in Cracow
 2005 – Film Ichthys – Sony Audience Award – Animateka International Animation Festival – Ljubljana – Slovenia.
 2007 – Film Peter and the Wolf – Oscar for Best Animated Short
 2010 – Film Danny Boy – The Taurus Studio Award and H. R. Giger Award "Narcisse" for Best Swiss Short- Neuchâtel International Fantastic Film Festival, Switzerland

External links 
 
 Marek Skrobecki online database Filmweb
 Marek Skrobecki online database Filmpolski
 Marek Skrobecki online database Stopklatka

Other References 
Halgas Iwona Peter And The Wolf, Published by Culture PL, June 2011
 Peter And The Wolf, "Ichtchys, published by Animation Across Borders, August 2012
Chopin Project, October 2009
 Peter And The Wolf 2006
Neuchâtel International Fantastic Film Festivalf Switzerland,2010

Polish film directors
Polish screenwriters
People from Kalisz
1951 births
Living people